Sacred Heart High School is a secondary school with academy status for girls. It is located on Fenham Hall Drive in Newcastle upon Tyne, England.

General Information
The school educates around 1,400 girls between the ages of eleven and eighteen on the site which has had a near £10 million makeover. The school consists of the main building, a technology and art building, a P.E. block, a maths and modern foreign languages building, a geography building, the sixth form centre, a small pottery and a dance studio. The uniform is currently (2015) a navy blue blazer and jumper, and a Douglas Tartan kilt or trousers(dark blue, light blue, green and white).

History
A private college was founded in Fenham Hall in 1903 becoming a Government-recognised boarding and day school in 1905, taking ex-pupil-teachers, scholarship and fee-paying pupils. The college initially opened with 60 pupils and was under the sponsorship of the Society of the Sacred Heart nuns. It went through a number of changes until 1926 when it obtained Direct Grant status and became a grammar school.

The grammar school lasted until 1977 when it became the Sacred Heart Comprehensive School, taking girls from 11 – 18 years old. In 1998 it was renamed the Sacred Heart Roman Catholic High School.

In 2007 the school signed up to the Building Schools for the Future initiative.

Alumni
 Donna Air, actress and television presenter
 Aimee Kelly, actress
 Catherine McKinnell (née Grady), Labour MP since 2010 for Newcastle upon Tyne North

Sacred Heart Grammar School
 Mary Glindon (née Mulgrove), Labour MP since 2010 for North Tyneside
 Frances Lannon FRHistS, Principal from 2002 to 2015 of Lady Margaret Hall, Oxford
 Dr Mo O'Toole, Professor of Creativity and Innovation  at Newcastle University Business School, Labour MEP for North East England from 1999 to 2004

Former teachers
 Sister Bernadette Porter CBE (taught 1975–78), Vice-Chancellor from 1999 to 2004 of Roehampton University

References

External links
 Sacred Heart Catholic High School Website
 Edubase

Catholic secondary schools in the Diocese of Hexham and Newcastle
Girls' schools in Tyne and Wear
Educational institutions established in 1905
Academies in Newcastle upon Tyne
1905 establishments in England
Sacred Heart schools
Secondary schools in Newcastle upon Tyne